PB-26 Kech-II is a constituency of the Provincial Assembly of Balochistan.

See also

 PB-25 Kech-I
 PB-27 Kech-III

References

External links
 Election commission Pakistan's official website
 Awazoday.com check result
 Balochistan's Assembly official site

Constituencies of Balochistan